The following is an outline of 1976 in spaceflight.

Launches

|}

Launches from the Moon 

|}

Deep space rendezvous

References

Footnotes

 
Spaceflight by year